Kenji Arabori (荒堀 謙次, born July 31, 1988) is a former Japanese football player.

Club statistics
Updated to 23 February 2020.

References

External links
Profile at Kamatamare Sanuki

1988 births
Living people
Doshisha University alumni
Association football people from Shiga Prefecture
Japanese footballers
J1 League players
J2 League players
J3 League players
Yokohama FC players
Tochigi SC players
Shonan Bellmare players
Montedio Yamagata players
Kamatamare Sanuki players
Association football midfielders